The following outline is provided as an overview of and topical guide to sinology:

Sinology is the study of China and things related to China. In today's usage, the term most often refers to work by non-Chinese or Chinese living outside China. Sino- is derived from Latin Sinae or Sinim ("the Chinese"), the origin of which is debatable. In the context of area studies, sinology is usually known as Chinese studies.

Essence 

China – East Asian country that is the world's most populous state (over 1.3 billion citizens) and the  second-largest country by land area.
Chinese Culture – one of the world's oldest and most complex cultures,  with varying regional customs and traditions in the fields of architecture, literature, music, visual arts, martial arts, cuisine, and more.
Culture of the People's Republic of China – blend of traditional Chinese culture, communism and international modern and post-modern influences, particularly other countries in East Asia and Southeast Asia.
Culture of Taiwan – blend of traditional and modern understandings of Confucianist Han Chinese, Japanese, European, American, global, local, and Taiwanese aborigines cultures formed into a Taiwanese cultural identity.
Chinese literature – extends over thousands of years, beginning with the Hundred Schools of Thought that occurred during the Eastern Zhou Dynasty (770-256 BCE).  Widespread woodblock printing during the Tang dynasty (618–907) and the invention of movable type printing (990–1051) during the Song dynasty (960–1279) rapidly spread written knowledge throughout China.
Chinese philosophy –  Chinese culture of thought spanning thousands of years, much of which began during a period known as the "Hundred Schools of Thought".
Science and technology in China – ancient Chinese advances began 2,500 years ago during the Warring States period. Ancient Chinese philosophers made significant advances in science, technology, mathematics, medicine and astronomy. Knowledge expanded with exchange of Western and Chinese discoveries.

History

General concepts

Greater China – refers to mainland China, Hong Kong, Macau and Taiwan.
Overseas Chinese – people of Chinese birth or descent who live outside of Greater China.
Sinophile – a person who demonstrates a strong interest in aspects of Chinese culture or its people.
Sinosphere – refers to a grouping of countries and regions that are currently inhabited with a majority of Chinese population or were historically under Chinese cultural influence.  It is also known as Chinese cultural sphere and Chinese character cultural sphere.

Sinologists

 List of sinologists

See also
 Area studies
 List of basic Taiwan topics
 Chiang Ching-kuo Foundation

References

External links

 Guoxue 
Chinese Text Project
Torbjörn Lodén, "Swedish Sinology: A Historical Perspective"
Sinology Project, University of Massachusetts, Amherst
The Sinology Institute, Beijing, China

Sinology
Sinology
 1